Kirby Cross railway station is on the Walton branch of the Sunshine Coast Line in the East of England, serving the village of Kirby Cross, Essex. Its three-letter station code is KBX.

It is currently managed by Greater Anglia, which also operates all trains serving the station.

History

The station was opened by the Tendring Hundred Railway, a subsidiary of the Great Eastern Railway, in 1866.

The station has two platforms with eastbound and westbound lines, but either side of the station the line is single-track.

The original station building has been disused for many years and has not been staffed since the 1990s. In 2016 it was reported that the line franchisee, Abellio Greater Anglia, planned to demolish the station building and provide platform shelters in its place. The buildings were subsequently offered to Tendring Borough Council for £1 each, should the council wish to renovate them.

Accidents and incidents
On 5 April 1981 eight people were injured in a low-speed head-on collision on the single-track line just east of Kirby Cross after an empty stock train passed a signal at 'danger'. An investigation confirmed the empty train's driver erroneously passed the signal at 'danger'.

Services
The typical off-peak service is:

Passengers for  must change at Thorpe-le-Soken for a connecting service to London Liverpool Street. On Sundays, passengers for Colchester must change at Thorpe-le-Soken.

During peak hours there are some additional services to and from London Liverpool Street.

References

External links

Railway stations in Essex
DfT Category F2 stations
Former Great Eastern Railway stations
Greater Anglia franchise railway stations
Railway stations in Great Britain opened in 1866